Latehar Assembly constituency is an assembly constituency in  the Indian state of Jharkhand. And after partition from Bihar, new state Jharkhand came into existence on 15 November 2000 and Latehar Vidhansabha came under Jharkhand.

Members of Assembly 
2005: Prakash Ram, Rashtriya Janata Dal
2009: Baidyanath Ram, Bharatiya Janata Party
2014: Prakash Ram, Jharkhand Vikas Morcha (suspended since March 2018)
2019: Baidyanath Ram, JMM

Election Results

2019

See also
Vidhan Sabha
List of states of India by type of legislature

References

Assembly constituencies of Jharkhand